Pizza Margherita (more commonly known in English as Margherita pizza) is a typical Neapolitan pizza, made with San Marzano tomatoes, mozzarella cheese, fresh basil, salt, and extra-virgin olive oil.

Origin and history

In June 1889 the pizzaiolo Raffaele Esposito, Pizzeria Brandi's chef, invented a dish called "Pizza Margherita in honor of the Queen of Italy, Margherita of Savoy, and the Italian unification, since toppings are tomato (red), mozzarella (white) and basil (green), ingredients inspired by the colors of the national flag of Italy.

The origins of Pizza Margherita came from mixing similar toppings that were already present in Naples between 1796 and 1810. In 1849 Emanuele Rocco recorded different pizza toppings like basil, tomatoes and thin slices of mozzarella; the mozzarella was thinly sliced, and added to the toppings already present.

In 1866, Francesco De Bourcard, writing about the Naples traditions, described the most commonly used pizza toppings at that time as well as the possible origin of calzone:

See also
 Neapolitan cuisine
 Pizza
 Pizza marinara

References

Sources
 

Margherita